Dagfinn Vårvik (8 June 1924 – 25 March 2018) was a Norwegian politician for the Centre Party. He was born in Leinstrand.

From August to September 1963 he was Minister of Finance during the short-lived centre-right cabinet Lyng. He was later Minister of Wages and Prices from 1965 to 1971 during the cabinet Borten, and Minister of Foreign Affairs from 1972 to 1973 during the cabinet Korvald.

He served as a deputy representative to the Norwegian Parliament from Akershus during the term 1961–1965. He was a deputy member of Oslo city council in 1971–1975. He was the chairman of the Centre Party from 1973 to 1977.

Vårvik graduated with a cand.oecon. degree in 1951. He worked in the newspaper Nationen from 1961 to 1991, as a journalist except for the period 1963 to 1988 when he was editor-in-chief. Vårvik died on 25 March 2018 at the age of 93.

References

1924 births
2018 deaths
Deputy members of the Storting
Government ministers of Norway
Foreign Ministers of Norway
Centre Party (Norway) politicians
Norwegian newspaper editors
Ministers of Finance of Norway
Sør-Trøndelag politicians